Industrial tourism is tourism in which the desired destination includes industrial sites peculiar to a particular location. The concept is not new, as it includes wine tours in France, visits to cheesemakers in the Netherlands, Jack Daniel's distillery tours in the United States for example, but has taken on renewed interest in recent times, with both industrial heritage sites and modern industry attracting tourism.

Attractiveness 

Even if the concept is subjective, depending on a person's preferences, it has been noticed (through market researches) that people like to see and experience the present or historic (heritage) production processes of:

 goods with a symbolic character for a region (from coal and energy in Ruhr, to bananas and coffee in Guatemala);
 branded, luxury goods like cars, watches and jewels;
 technologically demanding, innovative goods like computers and airplanes;
 handcrafted goods like porcelain and blacksmith products;
 drinks and foods.

An attractions directory for some Central SE European countries illustrates and includes this classification.

The attractiveness perception is also influenced by the cities' of destination ability to build touristic packages that reflect their industrial image and/or identity; respectively, in the case of tour operators, by mastering the industrial component in their attraction mix in the offered packages.

Presently, even on the mature markets, there are relatively few tour operators providing industrial tourism packages, completing other offers and almost always missing the specialized ones, as researched in a market study conducted by one of the tour operators providing such specialized services.

Destinations 

The most obvious industrial tourism destinations are cities and regions with a solid industrial base. For them, industrial tourism is a potential growth sector that matches with their identity: the sector offers opportunities to strengthen their distinctiveness and image, notably by building onto their already existing assets.

However, successful achievements are few and mostly in the developed countries (in Western Europe  - especially Germany, the United Kingdom, the Netherlands; as well as in the US and Japan) where a culture of leadership and collaboration between the different stakeholders at the community's governance level already exists. There is a positive trend and some remarkable achievements in Central Europe (Austria, Hungary, the Czech Republic, Poland), China and India too.

Also, attention is being paid worldwide to reconvert economically collapsed mono industrial areas (especially mining and metallurgic ones) through industrial tourism: Krivoi Rog, Reșița and Petroșani).

Important conditions for evaluating a destination's industrial tourism potential are:

 the quality of the location (local infrastructure, services, environment, other attractions, etc.);
 the accessibility of the attractions (the ease of reaching, the in situ visitor services, facilities or at least free access to and information about heritage objectives;  visitors centers or at least the possibility of scheduling individual guided tours at relevant  companies; qualified staff);
 the availability of information (public - private marketing cooperation).

Particularities of the demand 

 the largest majority of industrial tourists are from mature outgoing markets (Germany, Netherlands, United Kingdom, Japan);
 well travelled tourists, already saturated by the classic attractions (museums, churches) or second time visitors, shift from pleasure travel to in depth experience and education;
 increased curiosity about the manufacturing sector and industrial works from the younger generation for which, due to the new technologies and globalization, the domain is almost historic;
 active, elderly or retired workers and professionals driven by nostalgia and professional curiosity;
 local visitors, families with children;
 a combination with other attractions (cultural, natural);
 educational and business purpose (searching for work or business-to-business collaboration).

International associations and organizations 

Being a universal cultural asset, the industrial heritage and archeology gets a serious institutional (nonprofit), academic and governmental interest worldwide in the last decades, positively impacting its touristic potential too.

 The International Committee for the Conservation of the Industrial Heritage
 Society for Industrial Archeology
 The Association for Industrial Archaeology
 UNESCO

Other uses for the term 
Some environmental and conservation activists, such as writer Edward Abbey, used the term Industrial Tourism to refer to commercialized tourism in protected natural areas, posing a threat to their ecology.

In his book, Desert Solitaire, Abbey wrote: "Industrial tourism is a threat to the national parks. But the chief victims of the system are the motorized tourists. They are being robbed and robbing themselves. So long as they are unwilling to crawl out of their cars they will not discover the treasures of the national parks and will never escape the stress and turmoil of the urban-suburban complexes which they had hoped, presumably, to leave behind for a while."

In 2023, The United Nations Convention on Biological Diversity (COP15) highlighted commercial tourism as a threat to national parks.

References

External links

Family Heritage Tourism
Industrial heritage in Nordrhein Westfalen
Industrial Tourism in Japan
Report on development of industrial tourism in Kryvyi Rih in 2013
The International Committee for the Conservation of the Industrial Heritage
Society for Industrial Archeology
The Association for Industrial Archaeology
Industrial Heritage Analysis
Industrial Tourism in Silesia

 
Types of tourism